Norman Riley may refer to:

Norman Riley (cricketer) (1894–1960), Australian cricketer
Norman Riley (professor), English professor
Norman Denbigh Riley (1890–1979), British entomologist

See also
 Norma Riley, American electrical engineer